Nephelomys pirrensis, also known as the Mount Pirre rice rat, is a species of rodent in the genus Nephelomys of family Cricetidae.

N. pirrensis is a relatively large species. The color of the upperparts is brown and becomes lighter towards the sides. The throat is gray and the other parts of the underparts are buffy. The nose, ears, and forefeet are blackish and the thinly haired hindfeet are dark brown. The tail is dark brown above and a little paler below. Juveniles have darker fur. It is similar in size to N. devius, which occurs further west in Costa Rica, but is somewhat darker and has smaller auditory bullae.

It lives in holes under rocks and logs along streams. Several specimens were caught in animal runways. On Mount Tacarcuna, it occurs together with the much more common Isthmomys pirrensis, which is similar in appearance, but has longer ears and a hairier tail.

It was first described, in 1913, as a species of Oryzomys, Oryzomys pirrensis, but later synonymized under Oryzomys albigularis (currently Nephelomys albigularis). When that species was transferred to the new genus Nephelomys in 2006, N. nimbosus was recognized as a separate species.

References

Literature cited
Goldman, E.A. 1913. Descriptions of new mammals from Panama and Mexico. Smithsonian Miscellaneous Collections 60(22):1–20.
Goldman, E.A. 1918. The rice rats of North America. North American Fauna 43:1–100.
Goldman, E.A. 1920. The mammals of Panama. Smithsonian Miscellaneous Collections 69(5):1–309.
Musser, G.G. and Carleton, M.D. 2005. Superfamily Muroidea. Pp. 894–1531 in Wilson, D.E. and Reeder, D.M. (eds.). Mammal Species of the World: a taxonomic and geographic reference. 3rd ed. Baltimore: The Johns Hopkins University Press, 2 vols., 2142 pp. 

Rodents of Central America
Nephelomys
Mammals described in 1913
Taxa named by Edward Alphonso Goldman